Monosulfide may refer to:

 Carbon monosulfide, chemical compound with the formula CS
 Copper monosulfide, chemical compound with the formula CuS
 Mononitrogen monosulfide, inorganic compound with the formula SN
 Silicon monosulfide, chemical compound with the formula SiS
 Scandium monosulfide, chemical compound of scandium and sulfur with the chemical formula ScS
 Uranium monosulfide, chemical compound with the formula US